Stigmella nivenburgensis is a moth of the family Nepticulidae. It is found from Lithuania and central Russia to the Iberian Peninsula, Italy and Greece. It has also reported from Turkmenistan.

There are at least three generations on Rhodes.

They mine the leaves of their host plant. The mine consists of a slender corridor. Pupation takes place outside of the mine.

Notes

References

External links
Fauna Europaea
bladmineerders.nl
Nepticulidae from the Volga and Ural region

Nepticulidae
Moths of Europe
Moths of Asia
Moths described in 1942